New Market is an unincorporated community in Marion County, Kentucky, in the United States.

History
A post office was established at New Market in 1820, and remained in operation until it was discontinued in 1906. In 1877, New Market contained two stores and one church.

References

Unincorporated communities in Marion County, Kentucky
Unincorporated communities in Kentucky